Nikola Sjekloća (born July 10, 1978) is a Serbian-born Montenegrin professional boxer.

In 2003, he won the bronze medal in the 75 kg category at the 12th Senior World Boxing Championship in Bangkok, Thailand. He lost to Andy Lee of Limerick, Ireland at the European Championships in Pula, Croatia on February 25, 2004.

Nikola Sjekloća is a WBO International champion in the super middleweight division.

Sjekloća fought for interim WBC super middleweight title against Sakio Bika because of injured Andre Ward. However it was later changed and the fight was for number 1 contender that will fight for Andre Ward's World Boxing Council super middleweight title. Fight was promoted by Golden Boy Promotions and HBO and it was broadcast as one of the two main fights of the evening. It happened on February 16, 2013 in Boardwalk Hall, Atlantic City, New Jersey, USA. Sjekloća convincingly lost the fight by unanimous decision, and this fight was his first career loss.

Titles
2008 WBC International Super Middleweight Title.
2008 WBC Mediterranean Super Middleweight Title.

Professional boxing record

| style="text-align:center;" colspan="8"|37 Wins (12 knockouts, 25 decisions), 5 Losses,  1 Draw   
|-  style="text-align:center; background:#e3e3e3;"
|  style="border-style:none none solid solid; "|Res.
|  style="border-style:none none solid solid; "|Record
|  style="border-style:none none solid solid; "|Opponent
|  style="border-style:none none solid solid; "|Type
|  style="border-style:none none solid solid; "|Rd
|  style="border-style:none none solid solid; "|Date
|  style="border-style:none none solid solid; "|Location
|  style="border-style:none none solid solid; "|Notes
|- align=center
| || 37–5–1 || align=left| Bosko Misic
| || 4 ,  || 
|align=left| 
|align=left|
|- align=center
| || 36–5–1 || align=left| Jeppe Morell
| || 8 || 
|align=left| 
|align=left|
|- align=center
| || 35–5–1 || align=left| Bruno Tavares
| || 10 || 
|align=left| 
|align=left|
|- align=center
| || 34–5–1 || align=left| Farouk Daku
| || 10 || 
|align=left| 
|align=left|
|- align=center
| || 33–5–1 || align=left| Alex Marongiu
| || 8 || 
|align=left| 
|align=left|
|- align=center
| || 32–5–1 || align=left| Anthony Yarde
| || 4  || 
|align=left| 
|align=left|
|- align=center
| || 32–4–1 || align=left| Robert Stieglitz
| || 12 || 
|align=left| 
|align=left|
|- align=center
| || 32–4 || align=left| Slobodan Culum
| || 6 || 
|align=left| 
|align=left|
|- align=center
| || 31–4 || align=left| Balazs Horvath
| || 2  || 
|align=left| 
|align=left|
|- align=center
| || 30–4 || align=left| Ivan Jukic
| || 1  || 
|align=left| 
|align=left|
|- align=center
| || 29–4 || align=left| Slobodan Culum
| || 3  || 
|align=left| 
|align=left|
|- align=center
| || 28–4 || align=left| Tyron Zeuge
| ||  12 || 
|align=left| 
|align=left|
|- align=center
| || 28–3 || align=left| Callum Smith
| || 12 || 
|align=left| 
|align=left|
|- align=center
| || 28–2 || align=left| Jorge Rodriguez Olivera
| || 8  || 
|align=left| 
|align=left|
|- align=center
| || 27–2 || align=left| Mugurel Sebe
| || 3  || 
|align=left| 
|align=left|
|- align=center
| || 26–2 || align=left| Arthur Abraham
| || 12 || 
|align=left| 
|align=left|
|- align=center
| || 26–1 || align=left| Misa Nikolic
| || 2  || 
|align=left| 
|align=left|
|- align=center
| || 25–1 || align=left| Sakio Bika
| || 12 || 
|align=left| 
|align=left|
|- align=center
| || 25–0 || align=left| Hadillah Mohoumadi
| || 10 || 
|align=left| 
|align=left|
|- align=center
| || 24–0 || align=left| Nikola Matic
| || 6 || 
|align=left| 
|align=left|
|- align=center
| || 23–0 || align=left| Peter Mashamaite
| || 12  || 
|align=left| 
|align=left|
|- align=center
|Win
|align=center|22–0||align=left| Titusz Szabo
|
|
|
|align=left|
|align=left|
|- align=center
|Win
|align=center|21–0||align=left| Khoren Gevor
|
|
|
|align=left|
|align=left|
|- align=center
|Win
|align=center|20–0||align=left| Christian Pohle
|
|
|
|align=left|
|align=left|
|- align=center
|Win
|align=center|19–0||align=left| Roberto Santos
|
|
|
|align=left|
|align=left|
|- align=center
|Win
|align=center|18–0||align=left| Gordan Glisic
|
|
|
|align=left|
|align=left|
|- align=center
|Win
|align=center|17–0||align=left| Roman Shkarupa
|
|
|
|align=left|
|align=left|
|- align=center
|Win
|align=center|16–0||align=left| Artem Vychkin
|
|
|
|align=left|
|align=left|
|- align=center
|Win
|align=center|15–0||align=left| Lorenzo Cosseddu
|
|
|
|align=left|
|align=left|
|- align=center
|Win
|align=center|14–0||align=left| Bojan Miskovic
|
|
|
|align=left|
|align=left|
|- align=center
|Win
|align=center|13–0||align=left| Josip Jalusic
|
|
|
|align=left|
|align=left|
|- align=center
|Win
|align=center|12–0||align=left| Pierre Moreno
|
|
|
|align=left|
|align=left|
|- align=center
|Win
|align=center|11–0||align=left| Mile Nikolic
|
|
|
|align=left|
|align=left|

|- align=center
|Win
|align=center|10–0||align=left| Roberto Cocco
|
|
|
|align=left|
|align=left|
|- align=center
|Win
|align=center|9–0||align=left| Misa Nikolic
|
|
|
|align=left|
|align=left|
|- align=center
|Win
|align=center|8–0||align=left| Tony Averlant 
|
|
|
|align=left|
|align=left|
|- align=center
|Win
|align=center|7–0||align=left| Costantin Marian Armenga 
|
|
|
|align=left|
|align=left|
|- align=center
|Win
|align=center|6–0||align=left| Robert Andrasik
|
|
|
|align=left|
|align=left|
|- align=center
|Win
|align=center|5–0||align=left| Ivica Cukusic
|
|
|
|align=left|
|align=left|
|- align=center
|Win
|align=center|4–0||align=left| Aliaksandr Vaiavoda
|
|
|
|align=left|
|align=left|
|- align=center
|Win
|align=center|3–0||align=left| Dzemal Mahmic
|
|
|
|align=left|
|align=left|
|- align=center
|Win
|align=center|2–0||align=left| Tanju Guenes
|
|
|
|align=left|
|align=left|
|- align=center
|Win
|align=center|1–0||align=left| Ivica Cukusic
|
|
|
|align=left|
|align=left|
|- align=center

References

External links 
Nikola Sjekloca against Pierre Morreno

1978 births
Living people
Sportspeople from Niš
Serbian male boxers
Serbs of Montenegro
Mediterranean Games bronze medalists for Serbia
Mediterranean Games medalists in boxing
Competitors at the 2005 Mediterranean Games
AIBA World Boxing Championships medalists